The Wonderful Wonderful World Tour is the fifth major concert tour by the American rock band The Killers, in support of their fifth studio album Wonderful Wonderful, which was released on September 22, 2017. The tour include dates in thirty four countries of Europe, Asia, the Americas and Oceania.

History 

Throughout the summer of 2017, The Killers played festivals across Europe and North America as well as performances in smaller venues. At many of these shows, the band previewed several new songs from the then-upcoming album Wonderful Wonderful including the singles "The Man" and "Run for Cover". On August 28, 2017, the band announced on its website and via Instagram and Twitter posts that guitarist Dave Keuning and bassist Mark Stoermer would not be present on the tour; guitarist/keyboardist Ted Sablay and bassist/keyboardist/guitarist Jake Blanton, both of whom have toured with the band in the past, will fill in for Keuning and Stoermer respectively. The band also added more touring musicians: Robbie Connolly (keyboards, guitar), Taylor Milne (guitar, keyboards) and backing vocalists Erica Canales, Danielle Withers and Amanda Brown.
On December 1, 2017, Dave Keuning and Mark Stoermer performed with the band in Las Vegas for the Vegas Strong Benefit Concert to raise money for October 1 tragedy victims fund.

Personnel

The Killers 
 Brandon Flowers – lead vocals, keyboards, piano, bass on "For Reasons Unknown"
 Dave Keuning – lead guitar, background vocals (appeared on February 11-August 4, 2017 and the December 1, 2017 show in Las Vegas)
 Mark Stoermer – bass, rhythm guitar on "For Reasons Unknown", background vocals (appeared only at the June 25, 2017 show in Glastonbury and December 1, 2017 show in Las Vegas, and some warm-up dates)
 Ronnie Vannucci Jr. – drums, percussion

Additional musicians 
 Ted Sablay – lead guitar, rhythm guitar (February 11-August 4, 2017 and at the December 1, 2017 show in Las Vegas, and some warm-up dates), keyboards (February 11-August 4, 2017 and at the December 1, 2017 show in Las Vegas, and some warm-up dates), background vocals
 Jake Blanton – bass (except at the December 1, 2017 show in Las Vegas, and some warm-up dates, and he does not perform on "For Reasons Unknown", due to he takes off the stage), keyboards (at the June 25, 2017 in Glastonbury and the December 1, 2017 show in Las Vegas in Las Vegas, and some warm-up dates), rhythm guitar (at the June 25, 2017 and December 1, 2017 show in Las Vegas, and some warm-up dates), background vocals
 Taylor Milne – rhythm guitar, keyboards, background vocals (not appeared at the December 1, 2017 show in Las Vegas, and some warm-up dates)
 Robbie Connolly – keyboards, rhythm guitar, background vocals (not appeared at the December 1, 2017 show in Las Vegas, and some warm-up dates)
 Erica Canales – background vocals
 Danielle Withers – background vocals
 Amanda Brown – background vocals

Tour dates 

Festivals and other miscellaneous performances

Source:

Box office score data

Notes

References 

The Killers concert tours
2017 concert tours
2018 concert tours